André Mandouze (10 June 1916 in Bordeaux - 5 June 2006 in Porto-Vecchio), was a French academic and journalist, a Catholic, and an anti-fascist and anti-colonialist activist.

In January 1946, when he was offered a post at the University of Algiers, he accepted with alacrity—for him, Algeria was the birthplace of Saint Augustine, to whom he had dedicated his thesis at the Sorbonne.

A confidant of Léon-Etienne Duval, he agitated for the independence of Algeria. With other Catholic intellectuals, such as François Mauriac, Louis Massignon, Henri Guillemin, Henri-Irénée Marrou, Pierre-Henri Simon, he criticised the French Army for using of torture in Algeria, in the pages of Le Monde and France-Observateur,

In 1963, at the request of Ahmed Ben Bella, he became rector of the University of Algiers. But with the arrival in power of Houari Boumédiène, he resumed being a professor in the university and then returned to Paris to teach Latin at the Sorbonne.

He did not return to Algeria until 2001, to preside with President Abdelaziz Bouteflika over a colloquium on Saint Augustine who, for him, symbolised the link between Africaness and universalism.

Works
 Intelligence et sainteté dans l'ancienne tradition chrétienne (Cerf, 1962) ;
 Histoire des saints et de la sainteté chrétienne (Hachette, 1986-1988)
 Mémoires d'outre-siècle : 1. 'D'une Résistance à l'autre (Viviane Hamy, 1998). 2. A gauche toute, bon Dieu ! (Cerf, 2003)

External links
 Obituary in ''The Guardian, 14 July 2006
 Nur al-Cubicle, 3 July 2006
 The Memory of Resistance: French Opposition to the Algerian War (1954-1962), by Martin Evans, 1997, —contains a long interview with Mandouze

1916 births
2006 deaths
Academic staff of the University of Algiers
University of Paris alumni
French male non-fiction writers
20th-century French journalists
20th-century French male writers
21st-century Algerian people